Sanqor or Sonqor may refer to:
 Sonqor, a city in Kermanshah Province
 Sonqor, Zanjan
 Sanqor-e Bala, Razavi Khorasan Province
 Sanqor-e Pain, Razavi Khorasan Province
 Sanqor-e Vasat, Razavi Khorasan Province